The Volunteer Act 1900 (63 & 64 Vict. c.39), long title An Act to amend the Volunteer Act, 1863, was an Act of Parliament of the Parliament of the United Kingdom, given the Royal Assent on 6 August 1900 and repealed in 1966.

The Act amended the Volunteer Act 1863 by replacing the phrase "actual or apprehended invasion of any part of the United Kingdom" in section 17 with "imminent national danger or great emergency", thus permitting the volunteer force to be called out for service in times of emergency even when the country was not at risk of invasion. It also provided that any member of a volunteer corps could volunteer to be liable to be called up for service in a coastal defence role in any agreed areas, for service at any time.

The Act repealed section 2 of the Volunteer Act 1895, and was itself repealed by the Statute Law Revision Act 1966.

References
The public general acts passed in the sixty-third and sixty-third and sixty-fourth years of the reign of her majesty Queen Victoria. London: printed for Her Majesty's Stationery Office. 1900.
Chronological table of the statutes; HMSO, London. 1993.

United Kingdom Acts of Parliament 1900
1900 in military history
United Kingdom military law
Repealed United Kingdom Acts of Parliament